Rosalind Marquis (11 September 1915 - 12 June 2006) was an American actress.

Early life and career
She was born Rosalind Saindon on 11 September 1915 in Chicago. She was the sixth of eight children of Leopold Saindon, an usher of modest means, and Cora Vadeboncoeur. She was educated there at St. Patrick's Academy, before winning a beauty contest at the 1933-34 Century of Progress also in Chicago. She was always a talented singer and moved to New York City, where she worked extensively in theatre, before moving to Hollywood. However, Warner Bros. studios mismanaged her career, and despite three lead roles she never succeeded as an actress. In 1938, aged 23, she returned full-time to her singing career. While working as a backing vocalist for Edith Piaf on a US tour, she met her second husband, Ed Axton, and gave up the stage permanently.

Partial filmography
 Gold Diggers of 1937 (1936)
 Echo Mountain (1936)
 Marked Woman (1937) as Florrie Liggett
 Talent Scout (1937)

Personal life
She had three marriages, to William L Waller (25 May 1936 - 1937, divorced), Edwin Diamond Axton II (divorced) and Thomas E. Saxe Jr (until his death). She had three children with Ed Axton.

Marquis died on 12 June 2006 in Naples, Florida.

References

1915 births
2006 deaths
People from Naples, Florida
American film actresses
20th-century American actresses
21st-century American women